West Rand District Municipality is one of the districts of Gauteng province of South Africa, that covers the West Rand area, with the exception of Roodepoort (which is part of the City of Johannesburg Metropolitan Municipality). The seat of the district municipality is Randfontein. The most spoken language among its population of 820,995 is Tswana (2011 census). The district code is CBDC8.

Geography

Neighbours 
West Rand is surrounded by:
 Bojanala Platinum (DC37) to the north
 Tshwane (Pretoria) to the north-east
 Johannesburg  to the east
 Sedibeng (DC42) to the south-east
 Dr Kenneth Kaunda (DC40) to the south-west

Local municipalities 
The district contains the following local municipalities:

Demographics
The following statistics are from the 2011 census.

Gender

Ethnic group

Age

Politics

Election results 

Election results for the West Rand District Municipality in the 2021 South African municipal elections.

References

External links
 West Rand DM Official Website

District municipalities of Gauteng
Greater Johannesburg